FUEL Project  aims at solving the problem of inconsistency and lack of standardization in Software Translation across the platform. FUEL Project develops content especially for language users. It works at making technology friendly to user by working as an interpreter. An interpreter who has localized the language of technology and made a glossary of different keywords which is accessible by the user. Currently FUEL Project is working in 40 different languages worldwide. It helps the user to translate and understand different computer terminologies in his own native language. Additionally, the content and glossaries are provided as open source. They are completely free to access by user.

History 
FUEL Project was launched in 2008. It was initiated by Red Hat. It was started to create a desktop for a Hindi known user. It was inspired by the thought of making a Hindi user able to understand the language of technology. Glossary of different terms/command, style guide in that language and other content was generated. It standardized the translation standard. The result of effort made other language communities also work with FUEL Project. FUEL Project has organized several language community workshops with the help of local communities, language academies, university language departments, several important organizations and body like Red Hat, C-DAC, Wiki Media Foundation.

Need 
It is widely seen that many user are not able to understand computer terminologies. So for them it is needed to standardize those terminologies. Make technology talk in which they want it to. With each day passing society is drifting more towards a digital society where things are done online. Government Services, Online Exams, Filling forms for different purposes and what not. Digital platform is considered the easiest method, but for some understanding the same is not easy. Making them understand which term/command means what in the language they understand gave birth to FUEL Project. So for a user it is very necessary to get friendly with the budding technology each day. For doing so the user need to understand the language of technology then translate it for him to do a task. FUEL Project works  by making the language of technology friendly to him.

Services by FUEL Project 
 Terminology
 Translation Style and Convention Guides
 Unicode Text Rendering Reference System
 Guides for Translation Quality Assessment
 Knowledge Base contents
 Translators' Training

References 
 http://fuelproject.org/

Software projects